Jimmie Wilson (born February 7, 1981) is an American singer and musical theatre actor. He represented  in the Eurovision Song Contest 2017, with the song "Spirit of the Night" in a duet with Sammarinese singer Valentina Monetta but failed to qualify for the final.

Career
He studied acting in Hollywood, and then acted in the musical Sisterella, produced by Michael Jackson. He later moved to Germany to play Barack Obama in the musical Hope! – Das Obama Musical. In 2012 he took part in the third series of the Polish version of Must Be the Music. He was eliminated in the semi-finals.

Discography

Albums

Singles

As lead artist

As featured artist

Promotional singles

References

Eurovision Song Contest entrants of 2017
Eurovision Song Contest entrants for San Marino
Living people
Musicians from Detroit
20th-century African-American male singers
American male singers
American soul singers
American expatriates in Germany
American expatriate actors in Germany
American male musical theatre actors
1981 births
21st-century African-American people